{{DISPLAYTITLE:C9H10}}
The molecular formula C9H10 may refer to:

 Cyclononatetraene
 Indane
 Methylstyrene (AMS)
 Phenylpropene
 trans-Propenylbenzene
 4-Vinyltoluene

Molecular formulas